The 1919 Rochester Jeffersons season was the final season for the Rochester Jeffersons prior to its acceptance into the American Professional Football Association (now the National Football League). Participating in the loose New York Pro Football League, the Jeffersons resumed full play after playing only two games in 1918. The Jeffersons won the Rochester circuit with a 7–1–1 record, mostly against lower-level upstate teams, only to lose the New York Pro Championship to their regional rivals, the Buffalo Prospects.

Schedule

Game notes

References
1919 Rochester Jeffersons complete record. Professional Football Researchers Association. Retrieved 2011-01-14.

Rochester Jeffersons Season, 1919
Rochester Jeffersons seasons
Rochester